Wuhan Greenland Center is a  tall skyscraper in Wuhan, China.

The building was designed by Adrian Smith + Gordon Gill Architects in conjunction with Thornton Tomasetti Engineers won the design competition to build the tower for Greenland Group, a real estate developer owned by the Shanghai city government. Construction started in 2012 and had been put on-hold numerous times following the redesign in mid-2017 ranging from financial problems, to the COVID-19 Pandemic. The building finally topped-out in late 2020 and was completed in 2022. The Wuhan Greenland Center is Central China's tallest building and cost 4.5 billion dollars, mostly due to the number of times it had been put on-hold.

Original design

When the Wuhan Greenland Center reached its 96th floor, construction was halted due to airspace restrictions which led to its subsequent redesign to a  building instead of a  building. The Wuhan Greenland Center is currently the 14th tallest building in the world.

Floor directory (current design)

Timeline
8 December 2010: Ceremony for construction held.
1 July 2011: Overall construction started.
28 June 2012: Started building underground reinforcement structure.
12 September 2012: Started digging the base.
26 June 2013: Base completed.
4 January 2014: First steel beams installed.
28 July 2014: Basement finished, above-ground construction started.
Mid 2017: Construction stalled at 101 floors and the subsequent redesign of the building
Late 2020: Wuhan Greenland Center tops out
Mid 2022: Wuhan Greenland Center is completed

Construction gallery

See also 
 Goldin Finance 117
 Banning Shenyang Global Financial Center
 List of tallest buildings in China
 List of tallest buildings in the world

References

Buildings and structures under construction in China
Skyscraper office buildings in Wuhan
2019 in China
Skyscraper hotels in Wuhan
Skyscrapers in Wuhan